Psychological trauma in older adults (Usually older than 60 years, not to be confused with geriatric trauma) is the overall prevalence and occurrence of trauma symptoms within the older adult population (the term psychological trauma thereafter referred to as trauma; for general information on psychological trauma, see psychological trauma). Although there is a 90% likelihood of an older adult experiencing a traumatic event, there is a lack of research on trauma in older adult populations. This makes research trends on the complex interaction between traumatic symptom presentation and specific older adult population considerations (i.e., aging process, lifetime prevalence of traumatic symptoms [otherwise known as lifetime trauma]) difficult to pinpoint. This article reviews the existing literature and briefly introduces the various ways psychological trauma impacts the older adult population (apart from the occurrence of elder abuse).

Presentation 
Psychological trauma in older adults can present differently depending on the type of traumatic experience and when it took place. If the traumatic experiences of an older adult were recurrent in childhood (see childhood trauma or complex trauma) or in adulthood, the experiences can have varying but lasting detrimental effects on an older adult's psychological well-being, health, and cognition.

Childhood-based trauma considerations indicate that older adults with a long-term trauma history are more likely to experience more severe negative psychological, health, and cognitive symptoms. Additionally, the developmental timing of trauma exposure potentially impacts the outcome of PTSD symptoms and older adults’ psychosocial functioning. Generally, older adults who identify their most distressing traumatic event taking place during childhood indicated more severe symptoms of PTSD and reduced subjective happiness than older adults who’ve undergone later-life trauma. A specific example is the intersection between recurrent interpersonal trauma and post-traumatic stress disorder (PTSD) symptoms as an older adult. Research indicates that recurrent interpersonal trauma can be tied to experiencing chronic pain as an older adult in a manner that perpetuates both components.

Adulthood-based trauma considerations introduce the complexity of the interaction between an older adult's trauma presentation and potential neurocognitive components. Research indicates that older adults are more likely to develop dementia if they had PTSD than if they did not have PTSD.  The neurocognitive effects of PTSD symptoms can also look similar to the neurocognitive effects of cognitive impairment in older adults.

Psychological trauma diagnosis in older adults is considered less common than in younger adults. However, older adults' symptom presentations may make it more difficult for healthcare providers to identify trauma as the cause of an individual's symptoms (e.g., if the individual presents with somatic representations of trauma symptoms; see psychosomatic disorders). Some older adults may be more likely to report non-psychological symptoms and may not be aware of possibly experiencing trauma symptoms. Some trauma symptoms may present themselves later on in life (known as Late-Onset Stress Symptomatology), which could make pinpointing a potential cause even more difficult. It is also important to note cohort considerations. Most current older adults were raised during an era where psychological trauma was barely beginning to take root. This can make identifying and treating trauma within this population more difficult because there may be a lack of awareness or willingness to perceive their symptoms in a different light.

Older adults who experienced trauma in their later years may also retain harmful symptoms associated with the normal aging process (see old age). For example, there are several research studies on older adults potentially developing PTSD after experiencing a fall. As individuals age, the experience of falling may become more common, which may bring about a fear of falling. A meta-analysis of these studies found that female older adults with higher degrees of frailty presented with higher risk of developing PTSD after a fall compared to older adults with lower degrees of frailty and higher psychological resilience levels. Older adults' past experiences paired with current perceptions and health conditions are likely to perpetuate various psychological disorders (i.e., depression, anxiety, and phobias related to older adult considerations such as falling) as well as worsen existing PTSD symptoms.

Research 

Research on psychological trauma in older adults is sparse, with some individual studies lacking in empirical reliability and validity. In order to assess and treat psychological trauma in older adults, strong research needs to exist within scientific literature. This will support the development of psychological screeners for trauma to assist with differentiating trauma symptom presentation from other health or psychological disorders. Despite trauma symptoms can present in unique ways within the older adult population, there is no screener for PTSD specifically tailored for the older adult population. Some PTSD screeners have been tested with the older adult veteran population specifically and have proven capable of screening for PTSD effectively.

Most of the research on psychological trauma in older adults stems from the veteran population. PTSD in the older adult veteran population is a focal point for Veterans Affairs (VA; see Veterans Health Administration) research. Considering  that the concept of trauma originated with soldiers' experiences in the war (i.e., trauma was labelled as "shell shock" or "war neurosis"), the VA has maintained a close eye on trauma development and treatment for their veterans of all ages and identities. The VA has been considered a leader in trauma research for decades. As veterans age, this instills a need to further understand psychological trauma within older adults and how it impacts their quality of life.

Research on trauma in older adults is applicable within a clinical context as well. The National Center for PTSD (NCPTSD) conducts clinical research through the VA by implementing and providing psychological treatment for veterans who have experienced trauma, such as cognitive processing therapy (CPT), eye movement desensitization reprocessing (EMDR), and prolonged exposure therapy (PE). The NCPTSD claims these three therapeutic orientations have a 53% success rate in PTSD symptom remission. Although research indicates a general degree of success in exposure therapies for treating trauma in older adults, PE was specifically identified as a reliable therapeutic orientation for this consideration and population. If an older adult presents with both psychological trauma and cognitive impairment, it is suggested that the older adult receive an adapted or modified version of an evidence-based therapeutic treatment. If an older adult with psychological trauma is considering taking medication to supplement concurrent therapy services, the VA identified four medications for PTSD treatment: fluoxetine, paroxetine, sertraline, and venlafaxine. Although there is little research on medication use for specifically treating trauma in the older adult population, medication use overall (see pharmacotherapy) can serve as a tool for both psychological and health treatment. It is important to monitor medications' half-lives and potential harmful interaction effects that could come into play when taking multiple medications.

References 

Traumatology
Geriatric psychiatry